Allodus podophylli, the mayapple rust, is a plant pathogen. This fungal parasite forms tiny bright orange cups on the underside of leaves of mayapple.

While the name Puccinia podophylli is often used, in 2012 the name Allodus podophylli was resurrected based on DNA evidence.

References

External links 
 
 
 Mayapple Rust Resurrection
 Taxonomy of mayapple rust: the genus Allodus resurrected

Fungal plant pathogens and diseases
podophylli